Butoraj is a settlement in the hills south of Črnomelj in the White Carniola area of southeastern Slovenia. The area is part of the traditional region of Lower Carniola and is now included in the Southeast Slovenia Statistical Region.

The local church, built on a small hill southeast of the village, is dedicated to Saint Mark and belongs to the Parish of Črnomelj. It was first mentioned in written documents dating to 1526, but was thoroughly restyled in the Baroque style in the 18th century. The main altar dates to 1894.

References

External links

Butoraj on Geopedia

Populated places in the Municipality of Črnomelj